Dilip Lande is an Indian politician serving as MLA in Maharashtra Legislative Assembly from Chandivali Vidhan Sabha constituency as a member of Shiv Sena. He is from Mumbai Maharashtra.

Positions held
 2012: Elected as corporator in Brihanmumbai Municipal Corporation
 2017: Re-Elected as corporator in Brihanmumbai Municipal Corporation
 2019: Elected to Maharashtra Legislative Assembly

References

External links
  Shivsena Home Page 

Shiv Sena politicians
Living people
Maharashtra Navnirman Sena politicians
1961 births